Sadaung is a small town in Sagaing District in the southeast of the Sagaing Division in Burma.  It is located north of Okhnebin.

Notes

External links
 "Sadaung Map — Satellite Images of Sadaung" Maplandia

Populated places in Sagaing District